The 'Namgis are an Indigenous nation, a part of the Kwakwaka'wakw, in central British Columbia, on northern Vancouver Island. Their main village is now Yalis, on Cormorant Island adjacent to Alert Bay. The Indian Act First Nations government of this nation is the Namgis First Nation. They were formerly known as the Nimpkish.

See also 
 Kwakwaka'wakw

External links 
 'Namgis First Nation Website
 U'mista Cultural Society - Alert Bay

References 

Kwakwaka'wakw